Central Brasileira de Notícias, or Rádio CBN for short, is a Brazilian news radio network, jointly owned by Sistema Globo de Rádio (Grupo Globo's radio division).  It was created on 1 October 1991 as the first all news project on FM radio in Brazil, and broadcast news 24 hours a day.

Nowadays, Rádio CBN has four owned-and-operated stations in the cities of Rio de Janeiro, São Paulo, Belo Horizonte and Brasília. It also has 40 affiliate stations throughout the country.

Since its creation, CBN's slogan has been "A rádio que toca notícia" (The radio that plays the news). Its anchor journalists are Carolina Morand, Carlos Alberto Sardenberg, Carlos Andreazza, Carlos Eduardo Éboli, Milton Jung, Rodrigo Bocardi, Tania Morales and Tatiana Vasconcellos. The company employs more than 200 other journalists.

Programming 
CBN broadcasts two- to three-minute summaries, which provides the day's five key news stories and some notable sports stories, every half an hour, under the banner Repórter CBN. Eight standard hard news strands of the current schedule are CBN Madrugada, CBN Primeiras Noticias, Jornal da CBN, CBN em Foco, CBN Brasil, Estúdio CBN, Ponto Final CBN and CBN Noite Total. At weekends on a timeframe from 3pm to 9pm, some or all of it is taken up by live commentary of football matches, with the rest of it being covered by Show da Notícia. Other sport shows include Quatro em Campo and CBN Esportes. On weekend lunchtime the news review programme Revista CBN is broadcast.  O Mundo em Meia Hora presents the week's key international stories and how they affect Brazilians. CBN Praça presents the local news. Weekend, all friday's, Fim de Expediente bring in relaxed way the news of week with special guests. Also are presents CBN AutoEsporte about motors and Bem-Estar em Movimento about health.

Owned-and-operated stations
São Paulo: ZYD800 - FM 90.5 MHz (flagship) 
Rio de Janeiro: ZYD464 - FM 92.5 MHz
Belo Horizonte: ZYC733 - FM 106.1 MHz (licensed to Caeté)
Brasília: ZYC480 - FM 95.3 MHz

References

External links
Official website

Brazilian radio networks
News and talk radio stations
Radio stations established in 1991
Grupo Globo subsidiaries
Globo radio stations
Mass media in Rio de Janeiro (city)
Mass media in São Paulo
1991 establishments in Brazil